The Radio Lingua Network is a Scottish company headquartered in South Ayrshire, Scotland that provides various language courses through podcasts and other Internet-based media. Radio Lingua was founded in 2006 by Mark Pentleton, a former teacher of French and Spanish. Its first podcast, Coffee Break Spanish, was released on 18 October 2006. , the company had produced 36 podcasts teaching 27 different languages.

Radio Lingua provides courses about French, Spanish, German, Italian, Arabic, Catalan, Danish, Dutch, Gaelic, Greek, Flemish, Irish, Japanese, Luxembourgish, Mandarin, Norwegian, Polish, Portuguese, Romanian, Russian, Swedish, Turkish, Ukrainian, and Zulu.

Radio Lingua's podcasts have won several national and European awards.

Podcasts

French 
 Coffee Break French
 The Coffee Break French Magazine
 Coffee Break French To Go
 Coffee Break French Travel Diaries
 Coffee Break French Verb Fix
 En Route avec Coffee Break French ("On going with Coffee Break French")
 High Five French
 One Minute French
 On Location French
 Rock Star French
 School Run French
 Twitter Learn French
 La vérité éclate toujours ("The truth always shines")
 Walk, Talk, and Learn French

German 
 A Flavour of German
 One Minute German
 Coffee Break German
 The Coffee Break German Magazine
 Coffee Break German To Go
 Coffee Break German Travel Diaries
 My Daily Phrase German

Italian 
 Coffee Break Italian
 The Coffee Break Italian Magazine
 Coffee Break Italian To Go
 Coffee Break Italian Travel Diaries
 My Daily Phrase Italian
 One Minute Italian
 Twitter Learn Italian
 Walk, Talk, and Learn Italian

Spanish 
 Coffee Break Spanish
 Coffee Break Spanish Espresso
 The Coffee Break Spanish Magazine
 Coffee Break Spanish To Go
 Coffee Break Spanish Travel Diaries
 En Marcha con Coffee Break Spanish ("On going with Coffee Break Spanish")
 High Five Spanish
 News Time Spanish
 One Minute Spanish
 One Minute Spanish for Latin America
 Show Time Spanish
 Twitter Learn Spanish

Swedish 
 Coffee Break Swedish
 One Minute Swedish

Chinese 
 Coffee Break Chinese

English 
 Coffee Break English

Other Languages 
 One Minute Arabic
 One Minute Catalan
 One Minute Czech
 One Minute Danish
 One Minute Dutch
 One Minute Finnish
 One Minute Flemish
 One Minute Gaelic
 One Minute Galician
 One Minute Greek
 One Minute Hungarian
 One Minute Icelandic
 One Minute Irish
 One Minute Japanese
 One Minute Latvian
 One Minute Luxembourgish
 One Minute Mandarin
 One Minute Norwegian
 One Minute Polish
 One Minute Portuguese
 One Minute Romanian
 One Minute Russian
 One Minute Slovak
 One Minute Turkish
 One Minute Ukrainian
 One Minute Zulu

References

External links 
 

Companies based in South Ayrshire
Podcasting companies
Language-learning websites
Language education in the United Kingdom
2006 establishments in Scotland
British educational websites